Robert Thacker may refer to:
Robert J. Thacker, Canadian professor and astronomer
Robert E. Thacker (1918-2020), United States Air Force test pilot